Kalpatta Narayanan (born January, 1952) is an Indian novelist, short story writer, essayist, columnist, and a poet of Malayalam literature. He is known for his novel, Ithramathram and a number of poetry anthologies and other literary contributions. He is a recipient of several awards including Basheer Literary Award, Ayyappan Puraskaram and the Kerala Sahitya Akademi Award for Literary Criticism.

Biography
Narayanan was born in January 1952 to Palukkappil Sankaran Nair and Narayani Amma at Kottathara, a village near Kalpetta in Wynad district of the South Indian state of Kerala. After school education at S.K.M.J. Higher Secondary School, Kalpetta, he completed his college education at Government College, Meenchantha, Kozhikode before starting his career as a lecturer at Government Brennen College, Thalassery. Later, he also served his alma mater, the Government Arts and Science College, Kozhikode before serving as a visiting professor at the University of Calicut.

Narayanan is married to Radha and the couple has two sons, Praphulchandra and Sarathchandran.

Legacy 
Narayanan has published a novel, Ithramathram and several poetry anthologies. He has also published a number of studies, criticisms and general essays and has handled columns in dailies and periodicals; Ee Kannadayonnu Vacho Nokkoo in Madhyamam and Budhapaksham in Malayala Manorama are two such columns. He has also delivered speeches at various literary and cultural events. His novel, Ithramathram, has been adapted into a film in 2012, under the same name and his study on Vaikom Muhammad Basheer under the title, Ethilayum Madhurikkunna Kadukalil is a prescribed text for academic studies at Pondicherry University.

Awards and recognitions 
In 2013, Narayanan received the Ayyappan Puraskaram for his anthology, Oru Mudanthante Suvishesham. Two years later, his book, Kavithayude Jeevacharithram was selected for the Basheer Literary Award. He has also received Doha Pravasi Malayali Award, Dr. T. Bhaskaran Award, V. T. Kumaran Award, Shanthakumaran Thampi Award, C. P. Sivadasan Award ad Dr. P. K. Rajan Award. His book, Kavithayude Jeevacharithram was selected for the 2017 Kerala Sahitya Akademi Award for Literary Criticism. In 2018, he received Padmaprabha Literary Award for his outstanding contribution to the Malayalam literature.

Bibliography

Poetry 
 </ref>

Novels

Studies and general essays 
 www.insightpublica.com

Memoirs

See also
 Ithramathram (2012 film)

References

External links
 
 

1952 births
Malayali people
Indian essayists
Malayalam poets
Indian scholars
People from Kerala
Indian academics
Living people
Poets from Kerala
20th-century Indian male writers
20th-century Indian poets
Indian novelists
Malayalam novelists